Daniel (Danny) Basavich (born September 25, 1978) is an American professional pool player from New Jersey.  He is fondly called "Kid Delicious", a nickname he acquired after defeating a player monickered "Kid Vicious".

Basavich grew up in Manalapan Township, New Jersey.

Professional career
Basavich was a notorious road player who hustled pool games across the country, but later decided to compete professionally in tournaments after becoming too well known to continue hustling.

In 2004, Basavich was named "Rookie of the Year" by the United Pool Players Association.

He made his first television appearance in the 2005 WPA World Nine-ball Championship, beating Hsia Hui-kai in the preliminary stages. He made another appearance at the 2005 Skins Billiards Championship.

In November 2004, Basavich defeated Corey Deuel as the Glass City Open in Toledo, Ohio, in a televised match where he broke and ran nine consecutive racks of nine-ball, resulting in a score of 10–2.  He was defeated by Charlie Bryant in the finals.

L. Jon Wertheim wrote an article in Sports Illustrated about Basavich in its 2004 Super Bowl Edition entitled "The Amazing Adventures of Kid Delicious and Bristol Bob". Wertheim subsequently wrote a book on Basavich's adventures entitled Running the Table: The Legend of Kid Delicious, the Last Great American Pool Hustler which was released in September 2007.

In 2005, Lions Gate entered into negotiations for a feature film to be loosely based on the life of Danny Basavich.

In 2006, Basavich released the first in his new line of billiards tutorials, The Kid Delicious Advanced Clock System and Banking Secrets produced by Pooljax productions.

Filmography
 The Kid Delicious Advanced Clock System and Banking Secrets DVD (2006)
 Big Time Delicious Racking Secrets and Ultimate Pro Shotmaking DVD (2007)

Titles
 2005 Ocean State Championship
 2004 Sands Regency 9-Ball Open

References

American pool players
1978 births
Living people
Sportspeople from Brooklyn
People from Manalapan Township, New Jersey
Place of birth missing (living people)